Omobranchus fasciolatoceps is a species of combtooth blenny found in the northwest Pacific ocean, around southern Japan and China.

References

fasciolatoceps
Taxa named by John Richardson (naturalist)
Fish described in 1846